Camp Rilea Heliport  is a military heliport three miles (4.8 km) south of the city of Warrenton in Clatsop County, Oregon, United States.

External links
 Camp Rilea on GlobalSecurity.org

Heliports in Oregon
Military installations in Oregon
Installations of the United States Army National Guard
Airports in Clatsop County, Oregon